Cenchat is an unincorporated community in Walker County, in the U.S. state of Georgia.

History
A post office called Cenchat was in operation from 1902 until 1909. The community was named from its location near the junction of the Central of Georgia and Chattanooga Southern railroads.

References

Unincorporated communities in Walker County, Georgia
Unincorporated communities in Georgia (U.S. state)